Occlusion training may refer to:

 Alternating occlusion training, in vision therapy, using shutter goggles that feature a rapid flicker rate
 Eyepatch, therapeutic use to alternate between eyes
 BFR training, an exercise method involving vasculature compression
 Duct tape occlusion therapy, a method of treating warts

See also 
 Occlusion (disambiguation)